= Kalkuppi =

Coordinates: 15°56′N 74°49′E

- Village
- Interactive map of Kalkuppi
- Country: India
- State: Karnataka
- District: Belgaum

Languages
  - Official: Kannada
- Time zone: UTC+5:30 (IST)

Kalkuppi is a village in Belgaum district in Karnataka, India.
